In algebraic geometry, a derived scheme is a pair  consisting of a topological space X and a sheaf  either of simplicial commutative rings or of commutative ring spectra on X such that (1) the pair  is a scheme and (2)  is a quasi-coherent -module. The notion gives a homotopy-theoretic generalization of a scheme.

A derived stack is a stacky generalization of a derived scheme.

Differential graded scheme
Over a field of characteristic zero, the theory is closely related to that of a differential graded scheme.  By definition, a differential graded scheme is obtained by gluing affine differential graded schemes, with respect to étale topology. It was introduced by Maxim Kontsevich "as the first approach to derived algebraic geometry." and was developed further by Mikhail Kapranov and Ionut Ciocan-Fontanine.

Connection with differential graded rings and examples
Just as affine algebraic geometry is equivalent (in categorical sense) to the theory of commutative rings (commonly called commutative algebra), affine derived algebraic geometry over characteristic zero is equivalent to the theory of commutative differential graded rings. One of the main example of derived schemes comes from the derived intersection of subschemes of a scheme, giving the Koszul complex. For example, let , then we can get a derived scheme

where

is the étale spectrum. Since we can construct a resolution

the derived ring  is the koszul complex . The truncation of this derived scheme to amplitude  provides a classical model motivating derived algebraic geometry. Notice that if we have a projective scheme

where  we can construct the derived scheme  where

with amplitude

Cotangent complex

Construction 
Let  be a fixed differential graded algebra defined over a field of characteristic . Then a -differential graded algebra  is called semi-free if the following conditions hold:
It turns out that every  differential graded algebra admits a surjective quasi-isomorphism from a semi-free  differential graded algebra, called a semi-free resolution. These are unique up to homotopy equivalence in a suitable model category. The (relative) cotangent complex of an -differential graded algebra  can be constructed using a semi-free resolution : it is defined as

The Koszul complex acts as a semi-free resolution of the differential graded algebra  where  is the graded algebra with the non-trivial graded piece in degree 0.

Examples

If we take a complete intersection, then the koszul complex

is quasi-isomorphic to the complex

This implies we can construct the cotangent complex of the derived ring  as the tensor product of the cotangent complex above for each .

Remarks
Please note that the cotangent complex in the context of derived geometry differs from the cotangent complex of classical schemes. Namely, if there was a singularity in the hypersurface defined by  then the cotangent complex would have infinite amplitude. These observations provide motivation for the hidden smoothness philosophy of derived geometry since we are now working with a complex of finite length.

Tangent complexes

Polynomial functions
Given a polynomial function  then consider the (homotopy) pullback diagram

where the bottom arrow is the inclusion of a point at the origin.

where the complex is of amplitude . Notice that the tangent space can be recovered using  and the  measures how far away  is from being a smooth point.

Stack quotients
Given a stack  there is a nice description for the tangent complex:

If the morphism is not injective, the  measures again how singular the space is. In addition, the Euler characteristic of this complex yields the correct (virtual) dimension of the quotient stack.

In particular, if we look at the moduli stack of principal -bundles, then the tangent complex is just .

Derived schemes in complex Morse theory
Derived schemes can be used for analyzing topological properties of affine varieties. For example, consider a smooth affine variety . If we take a regular function  and consider the section of 

Then, we can take the derived pullback diagram

where  is the zero section, constructing a derived critical locus of the regular function .

Example
Consider the affine variety

Then,

The derived critical locus is then the derived scheme

Note that since the left term in the derived intersection is a complete intersection, we can compute a complex representing the derived ring as

where  is the koszul complex.

Derived critical locus
Consider a smooth function  where  is smooth.

Example
For example, if

we have the complex

Notes

References
 Reaching Derived Algebraic Geometry - Mathoverflow
 M. Anel, The Geometry of Ambiguity
 K. Behrend, On the Virtual Fundamental Class
 P. Goerss, Topological Modular Forms [after Hopkins, Miller, and Lurie]
 B. Toën, Introduction to derived algebraic geometry
 M. Manetti, The cotangent complex in characteristic 0
 G. Vezzosi, The derived critical locus I - basics

Algebraic geometry
Topology